The 1822 Vermont gubernatorial election took place in September and October, and resulted in the election of Richard Skinner to a one-year term as governor.

The Vermont General Assembly met in Montpelier on October 10. The Vermont House of Representatives appointed a committee to review the votes of the freemen of Vermont for governor, lieutenant governor, treasurer, and members of the governor's council. Democratic-Republican Richard Skinner was the only major candidate. The committee determined that Skinner had easily won a third one-year term against only scattering opposition. 

In the election for lieutenant governor, the committee determined that Democratic-Republican Aaron Leland had won election to a one-year term. A contemporary newspaper article reported the results as: Leland, 6,792 (61.4%); Ezra Butler, 1,838 (16.6%); William Hunter, 1,785 (16.1%); William Strong, 48 (0.4%); scattering, 604 (5.5%).

Benjamin Swan was unopposed for election to a one-year term as treasurer, his twenty-third. Though nominally a Federalist, Swan was usually endorsed by the Democratic-Republicans and even after the demise of the Federalists Swan often ran unopposed. Newspaper accounts of the election reported that Swan had received 7,986 votes (99.6%), with 34 votes (0.4%) scattering.

In the race for governor, the results of the popular vote were reported as follows.

Results

References

Vermont gubernatorial elections
gubernatorial
Vermont